"SHOCK" (ショック) is a series of musical works starring Domoto Koichi (from the duo KinKi Kids), who is also in charge of the planning, music, story, and production under Johnny Kitagawa’s direction. SHOCK was originally based on the musical "PLAYZONE '91 SHOCK" (1991, starring Shonentai), and premiered at the Imperial Theater in November 2000 under the title "MILLENNIUM SHOCK". It has been performed at the same theater every year since, with different modifications in the title, cast, plot and programs each year. In 2005, it was revamped entirely as “Endless SHOCK”, which has been its title until now. SHOCK's annual performances are greatly anticipated, and it is dubbed “the stage of which tickets are the hardest to get in Japan” by the media.

SHOCK reached its 400th performance in 2006, and it's 499th performance in 2007, attracting more than 80,000 audiences up until that point. SHOCK is the solo-starring stage play to achieve this feat in the shortest time at the Imperial Theater.

April 2008, “Endless SHOCK” received the Grand Prize Award at the 33rd "Kikuta Kazuo Drama Award" for high achievements in stage performance. This was the first time a musical starring an idol from Johnny & Associates won such an honor.

March 2009, Domoto Koichi set a new record for the highest number of solo-starring musical performances at the Imperial Theater.

March 21, 2013, 12 years 5 months after its premiere, SHOCK reached its 1,000th performance, became the solo-starring musical play to achieve this in the shortest time in Japan.

In April 2020, Domoto Koichi alone was awarded the Grand Prize of the 45th Kazuo Kikuta Drama Awards for his achievement for leading SHOCK series for twenty years, becoming the youngest single winner of this award.

Until 2021, SHOCK has been performed for more than 1,800 times, becoming the 2nd most-performed musical with the same leading actor in Japan, after Mori Mitsuko's “Hourouki” (performed 2,017 times).

Overview
SHOCK is about the conflicts happening in a theater company, interspersed with the shows performed by said company - a "play within a play". The series focuses on the theme "Show must go on" with KOICHI, the company's leader as the protagonist. Through his collaborations, conflicts, and reconciliations with the company members, the musical portrays a "stage of life" where even life is sacrificed for the ultimate performances. Domoto Koichi said “I'm completely different from KOICHI”, but they both share an unyielding, uncompromising attitude to the stage, even when facing injuries or accidents. Domoto Koichi himself also stated that he was able to cultivate such mindset thanks to continuously performing this play.

The play has a diverse combination of famous musical numbers and original songs in various style, from New York Broadway to traditional Japanese. Aside from difficult choreographies, SHOCK also includes numerous flashy, dangerous acts such as flying, falling down an 8-metre high staircase... , and is said to be able to “surprise the audience every 5 minutes”.

Under Johnny Kitagawa's production, SHOCK was originally intended to be a play that can impress the audiences even if they don't understand the speech. However, as an actor, Domoto Koichi wanted the stage to convey deeper meaning, and asked Kitagawa to make thorough changes, including the plot. With Kitagawa's approval (“Just do what you like.”), Koichi started taking a substantial role in screenwriting, music composing and producing since 2005.

After Endless SHOCK 2006, there were plans to end the SHOCK series and start a new play in 2007, also with Domoto Koichi as the producer and lead actor. However, due to high demand (demand for tickets was 14 times higher than supply), it was decided that the play would be performed again in 2007. SHOCK continues to be performed every year since, and is said to be “the stage of which tickets are the hardest to get in Japan”.

During the noon performance on January 23, 2008, due to electricity failure, the play was cancelled and moved to another date (February 17, 2008) for the first time. Domoto Koichi deeply regretted this, and wrote on the official site:  “It is truly regrettable that the performance couldn’t continue like the theme ‘Show must go on’. To the audiences who was looking forward to the stage, I sincerely apologize.” After the cancellation decision was made, all the cast came out to see the audiences off to the last one. The night performance that day still went on as scheduled.

March 11, 2011, the Great Tohoku earthquake occurred during the noon performance's intermission. The audiences and some of the cast were evacuated to Koukyogaien, and the performance - incidentally, also SHOCK's 800th performance - was cancelled. Due to aftershocks and planned power outage, performances could not resume as planned, and the rest of the performances that year were also cancelled. Cancellation announcement was made before the performance on the 13th by Domoto Koichi himself. He then shook hand with and saw all the audiences off.

During the noon performance on March 19, 2015, a 650 kg LED panel used in stage setting collapsed, injured 6 people:  Johnny's Jr. Kishi Takayoshi, 2 dancers, 2 acrobat actors, and 1 staff member. The two performances that day were cancelled, and Domoto Koichi came out in full stage costume to apologize to the audiences for the accident and the cancellation. Performance restarted the next day without the use of LED panel and part of the program changed. There were mixed opinions about restarting performances so soon after such a serious accident, but the decision was made with support from the cast and staff, even the injured ones, to convey the theme of the play:  continue to move forward despite unfavorable circumstances. May 20, 2015, Toho announced that the accident was caused by an inclination due to partial failure of the stage floor, and that reinforcement work was planned to correct this. Toho also officially prohibit future use of mobile LED panels on its stage for caution's sake.

On September 17 of the same year, during the Osaka tour, the actress who played the owner role, Maeda Bibari, fell and broke her left shoulder while walking to Umeda Arts Theatre from her hotel. She still acted in two performances on the 17th, but was hospitalized after the night performance and was told to rest for 1.5 month for the break to heal. Uekusa Katsuhide from Shonentai, who played the owner during 2009 - 2012, stepped in for Maeda from the performance on the 18th until the last one in 2015. Uekusa received direct appeal from Johnny Kitagawa and Domoto Koichi on the evening of the 17th, arrived in Osaka around noon on the 18th, and only had 4 hours to practice with all the cast. Nevertheless, the performances went on smoothly as usual.

In April 2020, Koichi alone was awarded the Grand Prize of the 45th Kazuo Kikuta Drama Awards for his achievement for leading SHOCK series for twenty years, becoming the youngest single winner of this award.

Until 2021, SHOCK has been performed for more than 1,800 times, becoming the 2nd most-performed musical with the same leading actor in Japan, after Mori Mitsuko's “Hourouki” (performed 2,017 times).

MILLENNIUM SHOCK (2000)

Performance period 
November 2–26, 2000 (Imperial Theatre) (38 performances)

Story 
KOICHI, leader of a travelling theatre company, decides to carry on performances despite the injuries of fellow member TSUBASA, and this brings about conflicts with other members of the  company. At such a time, the company receives an invitation to perform at Broadway - where KOICHI's older brother died 3 years before. Despite opposition from others, KOICHI pushes on to Broadway, and meets a mysterious person who claimed to be his deceased brother's friend...

Cast 
 Domoto Koichi
 Higashiyama Noriyuki 
 Tsubasa Imai
 Akasaka Akira 
 Suzuki Honoka 
 Sasai Eisuke 
 Akiyama Jun 
 Machida Shingo 
 Yonehana Tsuyoshi 
 Yara Tomoyuki 
 Ueda Tatsuya 
 Nakamaru Yuuichi 
 Akanishi Jin

SHOW 劇・SHOCK (2001 - 2002)

Performance period 
 December 1, 2001 - January 27, 2002 (Imperial Theatre) (76 performances)
 June 4–28, 2002 (38 performances)

Story 
To fulfill his deceased brother's wish, KOICHI continues performing every day with “Show must go on” in mind. His performances are popular, and he receives invitation to perform at the Broadway theatre Imperial Garden Theatre. However, he faces strong opposition from the company because it was where his brother died, and because he wants to leave behind TSUBASA, whose future as a dancer was abruptly cut off due to an accident when performing. Still, KOICHI leaves for New York, leaving behind his brother's ex-wife SAKIHO, SAKIHO's current husband TAKU, and a disappointed TSUBASA. A lot of troubles are waiting for KOICHI there...

Cast 
 Domoto Koichi 
 Juri Sakiho 
 Imai Tsubasa
 Nishikido Ryou 
 Kon Takuya
 Akiyama Jun 
 Machida Shingo
 Yonehana Tsuyoshi 
 Yara Tomoyuki 
 Kamenashi Kazuya 
 Akanishi Jin 
 Ueda Tatsuya 
 Taguchi Junnosuke 
 Hagesawa Jun 
 Totsuka Shouta 
 Toushin Yoshikazu 
 Tatsumi Yuudai 
 Koyama Keiichirou
 Yabu Kota

SHOCK is Real Shock (2003)

Performance period 
January 8 - February 25, 2003 (Imperial Theatre) (76 performances)

Story 
Almost the same as SHOW 劇・SHOCK, but with some changes in characters’ names (characters are named based on the casts’ real names) and the mastermind.

Cast 
 Domoto Koichi 
 Mii 
 Ikuta Toma
 Inoue Jun 
 Akiyama Jun 
 Machida Shingo 
 Yonehana Tsuyoshi 
 Yara Tomoyuki 
 Toushin Yoshikazu 
 Kazama Shunsuke 
 KAT-TUN
 A.B.C.

Shocking SHOCK (2004)

Performance period 
February 6–29, 2004 (Imperial Theatre) (38 performances)

Story 
Generally the same as SHOCK is real Shock (different production).

Cast 
 Domoto Koichi 
 Imai Tsubasa 
 Iori Naoka 
 Bitou Isao 
 Toushin Yoshikazu 
 Akiyama Jun 
 Machida Shingo 
 Yonehana Tsuyoshi 
 Yara Tomoyuki 
 Kazama Shunsuke 
 Totsuka Shouta

Endless SHOCK (2005 - 2020) 
Plot and characters were significantly changed. Starting 2013, the owner's role was changed to a woman, new songs and programs were added, but the main storyline remains the same.

Performance period 
 2005:  January 8 - February 28 (Imperial Theatre) (76 performances)
 2006:  February 6 - March 29 (Imperial Theatre) (76 performances)
 2007:  January 6 - February 28 (Imperial Theatre) (81 performances)
 2008:  January 6 - February 26 (Imperial Theatre) (76 performances)
 2009:  February 5 - March 30 (Imperial Theatre) (76 performances)
 2010:  February 14 - March 30, July 4 - 31st (Imperial Theatre) (100 performances) (first time the play was performed in summer as Endless SHOCK)
 2011:  February 5 - March 10 (Imperial Theatre) (48 performances) (performances from March 11 cancelled due to the Great Tohoku earthquake)
 2012: 
 January 7 - 31 (Hakataza) (34 performances) (first time SHOCK was performed in another province outside Tokyo) 
 February 7 - April 30 (Imperial Theatre) (105 performances)
 2013: 
 February 4 - March 31 (Imperial Theatre) (76 performances)
 April 8 - 30 (Hakataza) (29 performances)
 September 2 - 29 (Umeda Arts Theater) (35 performances) (first time SHOCK was performed in Osaka)  
 2014: 
 February 4 - March 31 (Imperial Theatre) (76 performances)
 September 8 - 30 (Umeda Arts Theater) (30 performances)
 October 8 - 31 (Hakataza) (30 performances)
 2015: 
 February 3 - March 31 (Imperial Theatre) (73 performances)
 September 8 - 30 (Umeda Arts Theatre) (30 performances)
 October 7 - 31 (Hakataza) (30 performances)
 2016:  February 4 - March 31 (Imperial Theatre) (75 performances)
 2017: 
 February 1 - March 31 (Imperial Theatre) (78 performances)
 September 8 - 30 (Umeda Arts Theatre) (30 performances)
 October 10 - 31 (Hakataza) (30 performances)

 2018: February 4 - March 31 (Imperial Theatre) (70 performances)

 2019
 February 4 - March 31 (Imperial Theatre) (70 performances)
 September 11 - October 5 (Umeda Arts Theatre) (31 performances)

 2020: February 4 - 26 (Imperial Theatre) (26 performances) (performances from February 27 cancelled due to coronavirus pandemic)

Story 
The show KOICHI performs at his childhood friend's small off-Broadway theater (starting 2013, the childhood friend setting was removed) receives high acclaim on the newspaper. This opens up a way to go on-Broadway for the theater. KOICHI who sets his heart on Broadway, the owner (name changed depended on the cast) who wants to protect his theater, the fellow company member (name changed depended on the cast) who considers KOICHI as his rival, RIKA who blindly worships KOICHI,... Each of them pursued their own ambition, and the company that used to be so close to each other starts falling apart. One day, the rival member who often clashes with KOICHI switches the prop sword used on stage for a real one to test KOICHI's creed of beliefs “Show must go on”...

Cast

Endless SHOCK 2005 
 Domoto Koichi (KOICHI) 
 Tsubasa Ima / Nishikido Ryo (double cast as the rival)
 Kuroki Meisa / Komiyama Mika (double cast as RIKA)
 Akiyama Jun (the owner) 
 Machida Shingo (MACHIDA) 
 Yara Tomoyuki (YARA) 
 Yonehana Tsuyoshi (YONEHANA) 
 Goseki Kouichi 
 Totsuka Shouta 
 Tsukada Ryouichi 
 Kawai Fumito 
 Takaki Yuuya 
 Nakajima Yuuto 
 Arioka Daiki 
 Ishikawa Naoki

Endless SHOCK 2006 
 Domoto Koichi (KOICHI) 
 Tsubasa Ima / Nishikido Ryo (double cast as the rival)
 Tabata Aya (RIKA) 
 Akiyama Jun (AKIYAMA - the owner) 
 Machida Shingo (MACHIDA) 
 Yara Tomoyuki (YARA)
 Yonehana Tsuyoshi (YONEHANA) 
 Fukuda Yuuta 
 Matsuzaki Yuusuke 
 Tatsumi Yuudai 
 Koshioka Yuuki 
 Ishikawa Naoki

Endless SHOCK 2007 
 Domoto Koichi (KOICHI)
 Ikuta Toma (TOMA - the rival) 
 Matsumoto Marika (RIKA) 
 Akiyama Jun (AKIYAMA - the owner) 
 Machida Shingo (MACHIDA) 
 Yara Tomoyuki (YARA) 
 Yonehana Tsuyoshi (YONEHANA) 
 Fukuda Yuuta 
 Matsuzaki Yuusuke 
 Tatsumi Yuudai 
 Koshioka Yuuki 
 Ishikawa Naoki

Endless SHOCK 2008 
 Domoto Koichi (KOICHI)
 Yara Tomoyuki (YARA - the rival) 
 RiRiKA (RIKA) 
 Okura Tadayoshi (OKURA - the owner) 
 Machida Shingo (MACHIDA) 
 Yonehana Tsuyoshi (YONEHANA) 
 Fukuda Yuuta 
 Matsuzaki Yuusuke 
 Tatsumi Yuudai 
 Koshioka Yuuki 
 Ishikawa Naoki

Endless SHOCK 2009 
 Domoto Koichi (KOICHI)
 Yara Tomoyuki (YARA - the rival)
 Satou Megumi (RIKA - the owner's daughter) 
 Uekusa Katsuhide (UEKUSA - the owner) 
 Machida Shingo (MACHIDA) 
 Yonehana Tsuyoshi (YONEHANA) 
 Fukuda Yuuta 
 Matsuzaki Yuusuke 
 Tatsumi Yuudai 
 Koshioka Yuuki 
 Ishikawa Naoki

Endless SHOCK 2010 
 Domoto Koichi (KOICHI)
 Yara Tomoyuki (YARA - the rival) (February and March performances)
 Uchi Hiroki (UCHI - the rival) (July performances)
 Uekusa Katsuhide (UEKUSA - the owner)
 Satou Megumi (RIKA)
 Machida Shingo 
 Yonehana Tsuyoshi 
 Fukuda Yuuta 
 Matsuzaki Yuusuke 
 Tatsumi Yuudai 
 Koshioka Yuuki 
 Ishikawa Naoki

Endless SHOCK 2011 
 Domoto Koichi (KOICHI)
 Uchi Hiroki (UCHI - the rival)
 Uekusa Katsuhide (UEKUSA - the owner)
 Harada Natsuki (RIKA)
 Machida Shingo
 Yonehana Tsuyoshi
 Fukuda Yuuta 
 Matsuzaki Yuusuke 
 Tatsumi Yuudai 
 Koshioka Yuuki 
 Ishikawa Naoki

Endless SHOCK 2012 
 Domoto Koichi (KOICHI)
 Uchi Hiroki (UCHI - the rival)
 Uekusa Katsuhide (UEKUSA - the owner)
 Kanda Sayaka (RIKA) 
 Machida Shingo 
 Yonehana Tsuyoshi 
 Fukuda Yuuta
 Matsuzaki Yuusuke 
 Tatsumi Yuudai 
 Koshioka Yuuki 
 Ishikawa Naoki

Endless SHOCK 2013 
 Domoto Koichi (KOICHI)
 Maeda Bibari (MAEDA BIBARI - the owner)
 Yara Tomoyuki (YARA - the rival) (February - April performances)
 Uchi Hiroki (UCHI - the rival) (September performances)
 Santos Anna (RIKA) 
 Fukuda Yuuta 
 Matsuzaki Yuusuke 
 Tatsumi Yuudai 
 Koshioka Yuuki 
 Yamamoto Ryota
 Kishi Yuuta
 Ishikawa Naoki

Endless SHOCK 2014 
 Domoto Koichi (KOICHI)
 Mori Kumiko (MORI KUMIKO - the owner) 
 Yara Tomoyuki (YARA - the rival) (February - March performances)
 Uchi Hiroki (UCHI - the rival) (September - October performances)
 Iriki Mari (RIKA) 
 Fukuda Yuuta 
 Matsuzaki Yuusuke 
 Tatsumi Yuudai
 Koshioka Yuuki 
 Yamamoto Ryota
 Kishi Yuuta (February - March performances)
 Nishihata Daigo (September - October performances)
 Ishikawa Naoki

Endless SHOCK 2015 
 Domoto Koichi (KOICHI)
 Maeda Bibari (MAEDA BIBARI - the owner) (until the night performance of September 17)
 Uekusa Katsuhide (UEKUSA - the owner) (since September 18)
 Yara Tomoyuki (YARA - the rival) (February - March performances)
 Uchi Hiroki (UCHI - the rival) (September - October performances)
 Miyazawa Ema (RIKA) (February - March performances)
 Kikuchi Mika (RIKA) (September - October performances)
 Fukuda Yuuta (February - March performances)
 Koshioka Yuuki (February - March performances)
 Tatsumi Yuudai (September - October performances)
 Matsuzaki Yuusuke (September - October performances)
 Nozawa Yuuki
 Kishi Yuuta (February - March performances)
 Morohoshi Shouki
 Kishi Takayoshi
 Matsukura Kaito (September - October performances)
 Ishikawa Naoki

Endless SHOCK 2016 
 Domoto Koichi (KOICHI)
 Maeda Bibari (MAEDA BIBARI - the owner) 
 Yara Tomoyuki (YARA - the rival)
 Kominami Mayuko (RIKA) 
 Tatsumi Yuudai (February performances)
 Koshioka Yuuki (February performances)
 Fukuda Yuuta (March performances)
 Matsuzaki Yuusuke (March performances)
 Nozawa Yuuki
 Morohoshi Shouki
 Kishi Takayoshi
 Matsukura Kaito
 Ishikawa Naoki

Endless SHOCK 2017 
 Domoto Koichi (KOICHI)
 Maeda Bibari (MAEDA BIBARI - the owner) 
 Yara Tomoyuki (YARA - the rival) (February - March performances)
 Uchi Hiroki (UCHI - the rival) (September - October performances)
 Matsuura Miyabi (RIKA) 
 Fukuda Yuuta (February - March performances)
 Matsuzaki Yuusuke (February - March performances)
 Tatsumi Yuudai (September - October performances)
 Koshioka Yuuki (September - October performances)
 Hamanaka Bunichi 
 Teranishi Takuto
 Matsuda Genta
 Matsukura Kaito
 Ishikawa Naoki (February - March and October performances)

Endless SHOCK 2018 

Domoto Koichi (KOICHI)
 Kuno Akiko (KUNO AKIKO - the owner)
 Nakajima Yuuma (YUMA - the rival)
 Takimoto Miori (RIKA)
 Fukuda Yuuta
 Matsuzaki Yuusuke 
Tatsumi Yuudai (September - October performances)
 Teranishi Takuto
 Matsuda Genta
 Matsukura Kaito
Kawashima Noeru
 Ishikawa Naoki

Endless SHOCK 2019 

Domoto Koichi (KOICHI)
 Maeda Bibari (MAEDA BIBARI - the owner)
Uchi Hiroki (UCHI - the rival) (February - March performances) 
 Nakajima Yuuma (YUMA - the rival) (September - October performances)
 Umeda Ayaka (RIKA)
 Fukuda Yuuta
 Matsuzaki Yuusuke 
 Koshioka Yuuki
 Teranishi Takuto
 Matsuda Genta
 Matsukura Kaito
 Ishikawa Naoki

Endless SHOCK 2020 

Domoto Koichi (KOICHI)
 Maeda Bibari (MAEDA BIBARI - the owner)
Ueda Tatsuya (Tetsuya - the rival)  
 Umeda Ayaka (RIKA)
 Matsuzaki Yuusuke 
 Koshioka Yuuki
 Teranishi Takuto
 Takada Sho
Tsubaki Taiga
Matsui Minatio
 Ishikawa Naoki

Endless SHOCK -Eternal- (2020 - 2021) 
A spin-off of the original Endless SHOCK to comply with the prevention of coronavirus. The musical is shortened to 2 hours, and some of the performances are deleted (such as falling down the staircase and some flying).

Performance Period 

 2020: September 15 - October 12 (Umeda Arts Theater) (31 performances)
 2021: February 4 - March 31 (Imperial Theatre) (60 performance)

Story 
Three years after KOICHI's death, the same members gathered again to mourn KOICHI and looked back to what happened during that period.

Cast 

Domoto Koichi (KOICHI)
 Maeda Bibari (MAEDA BIBARI - the owner)
Ueda Tatsuya (Tatsuya - the rival)  
 Umeda Ayaka (RIKA)
 Matsuzaki Yuusuke 
 Koshioka Yuuki
 Teranishi Takuto
 Takada Sho
Tsubaki Taiga
Matsui Minatio
 Ishikawa Naoki

"Play within a play" 
Mainly famous scenes from popular works, including: 
 Hamlet
 Richard III
 Romeo and Juliet
 Electra
 The Love Suicides at Sonezaki 
 Shinsengumi
 Notre Dame de Paris
 Yotsuya Kaidan
 Chushingura
 Mobydic
 West Side Story

Musical numbers 
 Take the 'A' Train
 Carmina Burana
 BROADWAY MELODY

Endless SHOCK 
 OVERTURE(INST)
 Composition / Arrangement:  Sato Yasumasa
 So Feel It Coming
 Lyrics:  3 + 3, Composition:  Domoto Koichi, Arrangement:  Sato Yasumasa
 NEW HORIZON
 Lyrics: Kubota Youji, Composition: Iida Takehiko, Arrangement: Funayama Motoki
 Yes we can (Yes my dream)
 Lyrics: Domoto Koichi, Composition: Chujo Misa
 ONE DAY
 Lyrics: Shirai Yuuki, Composition / Arrangement: Sato Yasumasa
 DANCING ON BROADWAY
 Lyrics: Hasegawa Masahiro, Composition / Arrangement: Sato Yasumasa
 AMERICA
 Lyrics: 3+3, Composition / Arrangement: Funayama Motoki, Co-arrangement: Chino Yoshihiko
 Love and Loneliness
 Lyrics / Composition: Anders Barren / Nina Woodford / Jany Schel, Arrangement: Funayama Motoki / Japanese lyrics: Shirai Yuuki / Arata Mika
 Solitary
 花魁 (INST)
 Composition / Arrangement: Sato Yasumasa
 戦車 (INST)
 Composition / Arrangement:Sato Yasumasa
 合戦 (INST)
 Composition / Arrangement: Sato Yasumasa
 死闘 (INST)
 Composition / Arrangement: Sato Yasumasa
 罠 (INST)
 Composition / Arrangement: Sato Yasumasa
 In the Cemetery
 Lyrics: Kubota Youji, Composition / Arrangement: Iwata Masayuki
 戻れない日々
 Lyrics: Shirai Yuuki / Arata Mika, Composition: Domoto Koichi
 Why don't you dance with me?
 Lyrics: Shirai Yuuki / Arata Mika, Composition: Domoto Koichi　Arrangement: ha-j / Yoshioka Taku
 Higher
 Lyrics: Shirai Yuuki, Composition:  Kawada Ruka, Arrangement : Funayama Motoki / 中西裕之
 Flying2 (INST)
 Composition / Arrangement: Sato Yasumasa
 マスク (INST)
 Composition / Arrangement: Sato Yasumasa
 夜の海
 Lyrics: Shirai Yuuki / Arata Mika, Composition: Domoto Koichi, Arrangement: ha-j / Yoshioka Taku
 大桜 (INST)
 Composition・Arrangement: Sato Yasumasa
 CONTINUE
 Lyrics: Kubota Youji, Composition: Domoto Koichi, Arrangement: Takahashi Testuya

Related products

DVD / BD 
 KOICHI DOHMOTO SHOCK DIGEST (June 19, 2002) 
 Koichi Domoto SHOCK (January 16, 2003) (recording date: June 25th 2002)  
 Endless SHOCK (February 15, 2006) (recording date: February 22nd 2005) 
 Endless SHOCK 2008 (October 29, 2008) (recording date: February 6th 2008) 
 Document of Endless SHOCK 2012 -明日の舞台へ- (February 6, 2013)
 Endless SHOCK 2012 (September 18, 2013) (recording date: April 21st 2012)
 Endless SHOCK 1000th Performance Anniversary (September 17, 2014) (recording date: March 23rd 2013 - the 1,001st performance)

CD 
 KOICHI DOMOTO Endless SHOCK Original Sound Track (January 11, 2006)
 KOICHI DOMOTO 「Endless SHOCK」Original Sound Track 2 (April 19, 2017)

References

2000 musicals
Japanese musicals